Woolford is a hamlet in southern Alberta, Canada within Cardston County. It is named after Thomas Woolford who came to the area in 1900.

Demographics 
Woolford recorded a population of 13 in the 1986 Census of Population conducted by Statistics Canada.

Woolford Flat 
Woolford Flat is located one mile northeast of present-day Woolford on Highway 503. The Canadian Pacific Railway built a subdivision from Raley to Whiskey Gap in 1910 bypassing original town site of Woolford leaving the settlement stranded from any railway services. The community was then divided into two town sites. The original town site became "Woolford Flat" and the new town site placed along the railway kept the old name "Woolford".

Woolford Flat consisted of the school house, the L.D.S. Church and three private residences.

Woolford consisted of a Chinese restaurant, a two-story general store, a United Church, a blacksmith, lumber yard, three grain elevators and 8 private residences.

Attractions 

See also 
List of communities in Alberta
List of hamlets in Alberta
List of provincial historic sites of Alberta

References 

Cardston County
Latter-day Saint settlements in Canada
Hamlets in Alberta